Semomesia croesus, also known as the Croesus eyemark, is a species of butterfly in the family Riodinidae. It is found in most of South America.

Subspecies
Semomesia croesus croesus (Surinam, Brazil: Bahia, Pará)
Semomesia croesus meana (Hewitson, 1858) (Brazil: Amazonas)
Semomesia croesus trilineata (Butler, 1874) (Brazil: Amazonas, Colombia, Peru)
Semomesia croesus lacrimosa Stichel, 1915 (Colombia)
Semomesia croesus siccata Stichel, 1919 (Bolivia)
Semomesia croesus undosa Stichel, 1919 (Ecuador)

References

Riodinidae
Butterflies described in 1777
Taxa named by Johan Christian Fabricius